National Primate Research Centers are a network of seven research programs in the United States funded by the National Institutes of Health to conduct biomedical research on primates. Each center is affiliated with a university or other host institution.

Research Centers
California National Primate Research Center (affiliated with UC Davis, Davis, California)
Oregon National Primate Research Center (affiliated with Oregon Health & Science University, Portland)
Southwest National Primate Research Center (affiliated with the Texas Biomedical Research Institute, San Antonio)
Tulane National Primate Research Center (affiliated with Tulane University, New Orleans, Louisiana)
Washington National Primate Research Center (affiliated with the University of Washington, Seattle)
Wisconsin National Primate Research Center (affiliated with the University of Wisconsin, Madison)
Yerkes National Primate Research Center (affiliated with Emory University, Atlanta, Georgia)

Former Research Centers
 New England Primate Research Center (affiliated with Harvard University) (1966-2015)

References

External links
 National Primate Research Centers
 Office of Research Infrastructure Programs

Primate research centers
Animal testing in the United States
Animal testing on non-human primates